Bogdaniec may refer to the following places:
Bogdaniec, Lubusz Voivodeship (west Poland)
Bogdaniec, Masovian Voivodeship (east-central Poland)
Bogdaniec, Warmian-Masurian Voivodeship (north Poland)